Sigurjón Birgir Sigurðsson (born 27 August 1962), known as Sjón (meaning "sight" and being an abbreviation of his first name), is an Icelandic poet, novelist, lyricist, and screenwriter. Sjón frequently collaborates with the singer Björk and has performed with The Sugarcubes as Johnny Triumph. His works have been translated into 30 languages.

Early life 

Born in Reykjavík, Iceland, Sjón grew up in the city's Breiðholt district, where he lived with his mother. He began his writing career early and published his first book of poetry, Sýnir (Visions), in 1978 at 16.

Career
He was one of the founding members of the neo-surrealist group Medúsa and became significant in Reykjavik's cultural scene.

Active on the Icelandic music scene since the early 1980s, Sjón has collaborated with many of the best known artists of the era and was featured as guest vocalist on a rare Sugarcubes 12" single "Luftgitar" in 1987 using the name Johnny Triumph; this was accompanied by a music video of Sjón playing air guitar with Björk and Einar Örn Benediktsson. Sjón would occasionally reprise this role for the final encore of The Sugarcubes concerts, including the band's one-off 2006 reunion show in Reykjavík.

Björk
Sjón and Björk first met when they were teenagers, and together they formed a two-person band called Rocka Rocka Drum. Later, when Björk began her solo career in the 1990s, Sjón wrote lyrics for her. The pair teamed up to write the song "I've Seen it All" for the film Dancer in the Dark in 2000, and as a result, Sjón and Björk shared nominations for "Best Original Song" at both the 2001 Golden Globes and the 2001 Academy Awards. Two years later, Sjón was featured in the documentary Inside Björk. In 2004, Björk performed "Oceania" – a song that the two had written together – at the 2004 Summer Olympics Opening Ceremony in Athens, Greece.

Writing
In 2007, he contributed the original story and wrote the screenplay for the animated film Anna and the Moods. He also joined the cast, voicing the character Dr. Artmann.

Sjón co-wrote the feature Lamb together with Valdimar Jòhansson. Lamb premiered in 2021 and was selected as Icelands contribution to the 2022 Academy Awards. Besides being Icelands contribution for the 2022 Academy Awards, Lamb got a lot of international recognition through festivals around the world. It has both been nominated and received prices at festivals such as Cannes Film Festival, Göteborg Film Festival, Sitges - Catalonian Film Festival, Palm Springs International Film Festival, European Film Festival, Edda Awards, Austin Film Critics Association, Athens International Film Festival, amongst others. 

From August to December 2021, Sjón was writer-in-residence at the Literaturhaus Zurich and the PWG Foundation in Zurich.

He co-wrote the 2022 film The Northman, a historical epic and revenge thriller based on the legend of the Viking prince Amleth, with director Robert Eggers. Björk appears in the film in a supporting role as a seeress.

Personal life
Sjón has lived and worked in London, but he currently resides in central Reykjavík with his wife. He has two adult children.

Works

Novels 

 Night of Steel ("Stálnótt", Mál og menning, 1987)
 Angel, Stovehat and Strawberries ("Engill, pípuhattur og jarðarber", Mál og menning, 1989)
 Night of the Lemon (Greyhound Press, 1993)
 Made in Secret / Your Eyes Saw Me ("Augu þín sáu mig", Mál og menning, 1994)
 The Story of the Great Cap ("Sagan af húfunni fínu", Mál og menning, 1995)
 Númi and his Seven Heads ("Númi og höfuðin sjö", Mál og menning, 2000)
 With a Quivering Tear ("Með titrandi tár", Mál og menning, 2001)
 The Story of the Strange Bird ("Sagan af furðufugli", Mál og menning, 2002)
 The Blue Fox ("Skugga-Baldur", Bjartur, 2003)
 The Whispering Muse / The Splinter from Argo ("Argóarflísin", Bjartur, 2005)
 From the Mouth of the Whale / The Marvels of Twilight ("Rökkurbýsnir", Bjartur, 2008)
 Moonstone – The Boy Who Never Was ("Mánasteinn – drengurinn sem aldrei var til", JPV/Forlagið, 2013)
 CoDex 1962 (JPV/Forlagið, 2016)
Red Milk ("Korngult hár, grá augu", JPV/útgáfa, 2019)

Poetry 

 Visions ("Sýnir", 1978)
 Madonna (1979)
 Birgitta (Medúsa, 1979)
 How Does One Make Love to Hands? (with Matthías Sigurður Magnússon) ("Hvernig elskar maður hendur?", Medúsa, 1981)
 The Blind Man's Bicycle ("Reiðhjól blinda mannsins", 1982)
 The Book of Illusions ("Sjónhverfingabókin", Medúsa, 1983)
 Oh, Isn't it Wild? (Medúsa, 1985)
 Toy Castles ... ("Leikfangakastalar", Medúsa, 1986)
 The Boy with the X-Ray Eyes, poems from 1978 to 1986 ("Drengurinn með röntgenaugun", Mál og menning, 1986)
 there is something I can't remember about the clouds ("Ég man ekki eitthvað um skýin", Mál og menning, 1991)
 obscure figures ("myrkar fígúrur", Mál og menning, 1998)
 the song of the stone collector ("söngur steinasafnarans", Bjartur, 2007)
 Collected Poems 1978–2008 ("Ljóðasafn 1978–2008", Bjartur, 2008)

Stage 

 "Shadow Play" ("Skuggaleikur") - a libretto based on the short story "Skyggen" by H. C. Andersen - Strengjaleikhúsið - Reykjavík 2006
 "Gargoyles" ("Ufsagrýlur") - a play - Lab Loki theatre troupe - Reykjavík 2010
 "Tales from a Sea Journey" - a play written in collaboration with the theatre group - New International Encounter - Oslo 2011
 "The Motion Demon" - a libretto based on the short stories of Stefan Grabinski - Figura Ensemble - Copenhagen 2011
 "Red Waters" - a libretto co-written with Keren Ann and Barði Jóhannsson - CDN Orleans - Rouen 2011
 "Hvörf" - a play cowritten with Lab Loki theatre troupe - The National Theatre - Reykjavík 2013
 "Folie à Deux" - a libretto in six songs created with composer Emily Hall for opera company - Mahogany Opera Group - premiered Bergen 2015
 "Seven Stones" - a libretto for an opera cowritten with Ondřej Adámek, directed and choreographed by Éric Oberdorff  - Théâtre du Jeu de Paume - Aix-en-Provence 2018

Collaborations with Björk 

 "Isobel" on the album Post (1995)
 "Bachelorette" and "Jóga" on the album Homogenic (1997)
 Lyrics for the songs featured in the film Dancer in the Dark and its soundtrack, Selmasongs, written in collaboration with Lars von Trier (2000)
 "Oceania", written for the opening ceremony of the 2004 Summer Olympics and featured on the album Medúlla (2004)
 "Wanderlust" on the album Volta (2007)
 "The Comet Song" featured in the film Moomins and the Comet Chase (2010)
 "Cosmogony", "Virus", and "Solstice" on the album Biophilia (2011)

Film
 Reykjavik Whale-Watching Massacre (2009) (screenplay and co-writer on screen story)
 Lamb (2021) (co-writer with Valdimar Jóhannsson)
 The Northman (2022) (co-writer with Robert Eggers)
 Klara: The Medium (pre-production)

Awards 

 1995: DV Newspaper Culture Prize for Literature for Made in Secret
 1998: Icelandic Broadcasting Service Writers Fund for contribution to Icelandic literature
 2002: DV Newspaper Culture Prize for Literature for With A Quivering Tear
 2005: Nordic Council's Literature Prize for The Blue Fox
 2005: Icelandic Bookseller's Prize for Novel of the Year for The Whispering Muse

Sjón was nominated for an Academy Award and a Golden Globe for the song "I've Seen It All" from the film Dancer in the Dark.

In 2016 Sjón became the third writer chosen to contribute to the Future Library project.

References

External links 
 
 Sjón on Words Without Borders
 Words Without Borders interviews Sjón
 Forlagið
 Licht & Burr
 
 
 

1962 births
Living people
Icelandic writers
Icelandic male poets
Nordic Council Literature Prize winners
20th-century Icelandic people
20th-century Icelandic poets
21st-century Icelandic poets
20th-century male writers
21st-century male writers
20th-century pseudonymous writers
21st-century pseudonymous writers